Rolf Lyssy (born 25 February 1936) is a Swiss screenwriter and film director.

Selected filmography
 Assassination in Davos (1975)
 The Swissmakers (1979)
 Kassettenliebe (1982)
 Leo Sonnyboy (1989)

References

External links

1936 births
Living people
Swiss film directors
German-language film directors